John Charles Stiles (born 6 May 1964) is an English former professional footballer and the son of 1966 World Cup-winner Nobby Stiles and nephew of Johnny Giles.

Stiles made over 150 Football League appearances in total, having played for Leeds United and Doncaster Rovers. He finished his career with Gainsborough Trinity.

He made two appearances in European competition for Shamrock Rovers in the 1982–83 UEFA Cup.

He is now a comedian.

Honours
Shamrock Rovers
 Leinster Senior Cup: 1982

References

External links
NASL stats

1964 births
Living people
Footballers from Manchester
English male comedians
Shamrock Rovers F.C. players
Doncaster Rovers F.C. players
Gainsborough Trinity F.C. players
Leeds United F.C. players
Rochdale A.F.C. players
League of Ireland players
English Football League players
North American Soccer League (1968–1984) players
North American Soccer League (1968–1984) indoor players
Vancouver Whitecaps (1986–2010) players
Association football midfielders
English footballers
English expatriate sportspeople in the United States
Expatriate soccer players in the United States
English expatriate footballers
English expatriate sportspeople in Canada
Expatriate soccer players in Canada